The Smith & Wesson Model 500 is a five-shot, double/single action large-caliber revolver produced by Smith & Wesson, firing the .500 S&W Magnum cartridge.

Design
The Model 500 was built on the entirely new X-Frame, which was developed exclusively to handle the immense muzzle velocity and pressures generated by firing of the .500 Magnum cartridge. It is among the most powerful revolvers in the world since its original release in 2003, and is marketed as "the world's most powerful handgun" by the manufacturer.

Commercial loadings are available in bullet weights ranging from 275 gr to 700 gr. The Model 500 is capable of firing the shorter .500 S&W Special cartridge.

Instead of a traditional barrel, the S&W 500 uses a rifled tube inside a barrel shroud that is secured by tension from the front. This tensioning leads to stability, making barrels less expensive to produce and resulting in a more accurate revolver.

Lockup is accomplished by a center-pin in the rear of the cylinder and a ball detent in the frame.

The advanced design of the firearm helps in counteracting the recoil felt by the shooter. This includes the sheer weight of the firearm, use of rubber grips, the forward balance, and the use of a compensator. On certain S&W Performance Center models the compensator is replaced with a muzzle brake.

Like most large caliber handguns, the Model 500 is suitable for sport and hunting applications. The high energy of these rounds makes it possible to hunt extremely large African game successfully.

Variants
 Model 500ES: 2.75″ barrel, stainless steel Emergency Survival snubnosed revolver with blaze orange Hogue grips (no longer manufactured as of December 2009).
 Model 500: 3.5″ barrel, stainless steel with HI VIZ® fiber optic sight.
 Model 500: 4″ barrel, stainless steel with two compensators.
 Model 500: 6.5″ barrel, half lug, stainless steel with compensator (discontinued in 2020).
 Model 500: 7.5″ barrel, stainless steel with muzzle brake.
 Model 500: 8.38″ barrel, stainless steel with compensator.
 Model 500 HI VIZ®: 8.38″ barrel, stainless steel with interchangeable compensators.
 Model 500: 10.5″ Lothar-Walther custom German rifle barrel, matte finish stainless steel with muzzle brake.

Other variants are available through the Smith & Wesson's Performance Center. Like all Smith & Wesson revolvers, "custom" variants are available on special production runs with a minimum order of 500 units. An example is the John Ross Performance Center 5″ .500 S&W Magnum, which features a 5-inch barrel with an external muzzle nut instead of a muzzle brake or compensator and a Millet dovetail front sight.

Gallery

See also
 Smith & Wesson Model 460
 .50 caliber handguns
 List of handgun cartridges

References

External links
Model 500ES: 2.75" barrel, stainless steel
Model 500: 3.5" barrel HI VIZ® Fiber Optic sight, stainless steel
Model 500: 4" barrel, stainless steel with 2 compensators
Model 500: 6.5" barrel, half lug, stainless steel with compensator
Model 500: 7.5" barrel, stainless steel with muzzle brake
Model 500: 8.38" barrel, stainless steel with compensator
Model 500: 8.38" barrel HI VIZ® Fiber Optic sight, stainless steel with interchangeable compensators
Model 500: 10.5" Lothar-Walther custom German rifle barrel, matte finish stainless steel with muzzle brake

.50 caliber handguns
Revolvers of the United States
Smith & Wesson revolvers
Weapons and ammunition introduced in 2003